Redstone is an unincorporated town and a census-designated place (CDP) located in and governed by Pitkin County, Colorado, United States. The CDP is a part of the Glenwood Springs, CO Micropolitan Statistical Area. The population of the Redstone CDP was 130 at the United States Census 2010. The Carbondale post office  serves Redstone postal addresses.

The village is listed on the National Register of Historic Places as a historic district and includes several properties that are also separately listed on the National Register.

History
Redstone was established in the late 19th century by industrialist John Cleveland Osgood as part of a coal mining enterprise. Osgood's coal empire also spurred construction of the Crystal River Railroad and Redstone's historic dwellings. As an experiment in "enlightened industrial paternalism," Osgood constructed 84 cottages and a 40-room inn, all with indoor plumbing and electricity, for his coal miners and cokers, as well as modern bathhouse facilities, a club house with a library and a theatre, and a school. Most of these Craftsman-era Swiss-style cottages are still used as homes.

Cleveholm
A dominant feature of Redstone is Cleveholm Manor, commonly called "Redstone Castle," an opulent 42-room Tudor-style mansion that Osgood built for his second wife, Swedish Countess Alma Regina Shelgrem. Construction of Cleveholm Manor, which was designed by New York architects Boal and Harnois, began in 1897 and was completed in 1901. The Castle was part of a  estate that also included servants' quarters, a gamekeeper's lodge, a carriage house, and a greenhouse. Cleveholm Manor and the gamekeeper's cottage are both independently listed on the National Register as Osgood Castle and Osgood Gamekeeper's Lodge, respectively. As of 2004, the Castle still contained 75 percent of its original furnishings.

The historic inn in Redstone, which is independently listed on the National Register as Redstone Inn, is now operated as a resort inn, offering year-round accommodations.

Geography

Climate
Redstone has a humid continental climate (Koppen: Dfb). Summers are warm with cool nights and winters are cold with extremely heavy snowfall averaging 170 inches (430 cm) annually.

Demographics

See also

Colorado
Outline of Colorado
Index of Colorado-related articles
Bibliography of Colorado
Geography of Colorado
History of Colorado
Colorado statistical areas
Glenwood Springs, CO Micropolitan Statistical Area
List of counties in Colorado
Pitkin County, Colorado
National Register of Historic Places listings in Pitkin County, Colorado
List of places in Colorado
List of census-designated places in Colorado
List of forts in Colorado
List of ghost towns in Colorado
List of mountain passes in Colorado
List of mountain peaks of Colorado
List of municipalities in Colorado
List of post offices in Colorado
Protected areas of Colorado

References

External links

Redstone Community Association
Redstone Historical Society
Redstone @ History Colorado
Redstone @ WesternMiningHistory.com
Redstone @ Colorado.com
Redstone @ UncoverColorado.com
Redstone Castle
Pitkin County website

Census-designated places in Pitkin County, Colorado
Census-designated places in Colorado
Populated places established in 1898